William Watson, Baron Watson,  (25 August 1827 – 14 September 1899) was a Scottish lawyer and Conservative Party politician. He was Lord Advocate, the most senior Law Officer in Scotland, from 1876 to 1880, and was then appointed a Lord of Appeal in Ordinary.

Early life
Watson was born in Covington, Lanarkshire on 25 August 1827. He was the eldest son and second of the six children of Eleonora and Reverend Thomas Watson. He was educated privately and studied law at the universities of Glasgow and Edinburgh. He was admitted to the Faculty of Advocates in 1851 and appeared for the defence of Dr Edward William Pritchard, the poisoner, in 1865.

Career
Watson was appointed Solicitor General for Scotland, one of the Scottish Law Officers and deputy to the Lord Advocate, in 1874, and was elected Dean of the Faculty of Advocates in 1875. In 1876, the Lord Advocate, Edward Gordon, was appointed a Lord of Appeal in Ordinary (Lord Gordon of Drumearn) and resigned as Lord Advocate and Member of Parliament (MP) for Glasgow and Aberdeen Universities. Watson won the ensuing by-election and was appointed Lord Advocate. He was appointed a Privy Counsellor in 1878.

Watson did not stand for re-election at the 1880 general election, and was instead appointed a Lord of Appeal in Ordinary as Baron Watson, of Thankerton in the County of Lanark. As a member of the Privy Council, he was also entitled to sit on the Judicial Committee of the Privy Council.

Judgements
Foakes v Beer [1884] UKHL 1, [1881-85] All ER Rep 106, (1884) 9 App Cas 605; 54 LJQB 130; 51 LT 833; 33 WR 233 - a leading case from the House of Lords on the legal concept of consideration
Liquidators of the Maritime Bank of Canada v. Receiver-General of New Brunswick [1892] A.C. 437 - statement of provincial powers under the BNA Act 1867
Cooper v Stuart (1889); the case which cemented the legal fiction of terra nullius in Australia for a century before the High Court overturned it with Mabo v Queensland (No 2) in 1992.

Personal life
Watson married Margaret Bannatyne (1846-1898) in 1868, and the couple had five sons and a daughter. His son William also became a law lord as Lord Thankerton while another son, Ronald, was a first-class cricketer. Watson lived at 20 Queen's Gate in South Kensington, and was a member of the Athenæum and the Carlton Club.

He is buried in Dean Cemetery in Edinburgh against the north wall, of the Victorian north extension, near the north-west corner.

References

External links 
 

1827 births
1899 deaths
19th-century Scottish judges
Law lords
Scottish Tory MPs (pre-1912)
Members of the Parliament of the United Kingdom for Glasgow and Aberdeen Universities
UK MPs 1874–1880
UK MPs who were granted peerages
Members of the Privy Council of the United Kingdom
Members of the Judicial Committee of the Privy Council
Scholars of constitutional law
Deans of the Faculty of Advocates
Alumni of the University of Edinburgh
Solicitors General for Scotland
Lord Advocates
Alumni of the University of Glasgow
Scottish legal writers
19th-century Scottish writers
Life peers created by Queen Victoria